Christopher Hübner (born 15 November 1986) is a German former professional footballer who played as a midfielder.

Personal life
His brothers Benjamin and Florian are professional footballers and his father Bruno Hübner is director of sports at Eintracht Frankfurt.

References

External links
 
 
 Profile at FuPa.net

Living people
1986 births
Sportspeople from Wiesbaden
Association football defenders
German footballers
SV Wehen Wiesbaden players
SV Darmstadt 98 players
2. Bundesliga players
3. Liga players
Footballers from Hesse